William Akio (born 23 July 1998) is a South Sudanese professional footballer who plays as a forward for Raith Rovers, on loan from Ross County, and the South Sudan national team.

Early life
Akio was born in a refugee camp in Nairobi, Kenya to South Sudanese parents who had fled the Second Sudanese Civil War. He later immigrated to Canada with his family, where he grew up in Calgary. He is the older brother of fellow football player Victor Loturi.

Club career

Early career
In 2016, Akio attended the Southern Alberta Institute of Technology, where he scored eighteen goals in nineteen appearances over two years. In 2018, he transferred to the University of Texas Rio Grande Valley, where he went on to score eighteen goals in 41 appearances. Akio played for Calgary Foothills in USL League Two from 2017 to 2019, scoring 13 goals in 29 games, adding another 1 goal in 6 playoff games. In 2019, he would score 11 goals in 12 appearances.

Valour FC
On 5 May 2021, Akio signed his first professional contract with Canadian Premier League side Valour FC. On 27 June 2021, he made his debut as a substitute in a 2–0 win over Forge FC. He scored his first professional goal on June 30 in a match against HFX Wanderers. Valour started the season off very strong, aided by home field advantage as the first segment of the season was played only in Winnipeg due to the Covid-19 pandemic. When this part of the season ended, the team began to struggle midway through the season and fell out of a playoff position. However, Akio helped lead a resurgence near the end of the season, pushing Valour right into the thick of the playoff race, with performances such as his two goals and an assist in a crucial match against Cavalry. But despite Akio and the rest of the team's efforts, Valour just missed out of the playoffs. Overall Akio had a strong first professional season, finishing with eight goals and three assists, and was in especially excellent form in October and November, being named in the CPL Team of the Week twice.

In January 2022, Valour announced they had picked up Akio's contract option, keeping him at the club through 2022. He remained a fixture in Valour's starting eleven. During this season he made international headlines in an unfortunate way, by accidentally making a goal-line clearance of his own teammate's shot. However, Valour still won the game. This incident did not derail his career, as just a week later he moved up through securing a transfer with Ross County, who had been impressed with his overall play. Akio departed Valour as the club's second highest goalscorer all time, behind Moses Dyer.

Ross County
In July 2022, Scottish Premiership side Ross County announced they had signed Akio from Valour FC on a three-year deal. On his debut against East Fife on July 23 in a Scottish League Cup match, Akio tallied two assists in less than two minutes. Later on in the game, Akio suffered a knee injury for which he underwent surgery for, sidelining him.  On September 3, Akio made his league debut for Ross County against Aberdeen where he scored a last minute goal in the 95th minute to secure a point.  Akio made his first start for the club on September 17 in an away league match against St Johnstone where they drew 0-0.

Raith Rovers (loan) 
On 28 January 2023, Akio would be loaned to Scottish Championship side Raith Rovers. He would make his debut on the same day coming off the bench in a league game against Inverness Caledonian Thistle. Akio scored his first goal for The Rovers on 8 February 2023 in a Scottish Challenge Cup game against Dundee F.C. Raith went on to win the match 4-3 in penalties to advance the finals of the cup.

International career
In 2021, Akio received his first call-up to the South Sudan national team, but did not make an appearance. A month after signing his first pro contract with Valour FC, he received another call-up for a friendly against Jordan. After the 2021 CPL season ended, Akio was again called up by South Sudan for friendlies against the Gambia and Algeria. Akio eventually made his international debut on 27 January 2022 in a friendly defeat to Uzbekistan.

Personal life 
Akio runs a YouTube channel about his experiences as a professional and international soccer player, the channel has over 35,000 subscribers.

Career statistics

Club

International

References

External links
National Football Teams profile

1998 births
Living people
Association football forwards
Canadian soccer players
Canadian people of South Sudanese descent
Canadian sportspeople of African descent
Sportspeople of South Sudanese descent
People with acquired South Sudanese citizenship
South Sudanese footballers
Footballers from Nairobi
Sudanese emigrants to Canada
People with acquired Canadian citizenship
University and college soccer players in Canada
Canadian expatriate soccer players
South Sudanese expatriate footballers
Expatriate soccer players in the United States
South Sudanese expatriate sportspeople in the United States
Canadian expatriate sportspeople in the United States
Southern Alberta Institute of Technology alumni
UT Rio Grande Valley Vaqueros men's soccer players
Calgary Foothills FC players
Valour FC players
USL League Two players
Canadian Premier League players
South Sudan international footballers
Ross County F.C. players
Expatriate footballers in Scotland
South Sudanese refugees
Canadian expatriate sportspeople in Scotland
Refugees in Kenya
South Sudanese expatriate sportspeople in Scotland
Soccer players from Calgary
Raith Rovers F.C. players